The Case of the Frightened Lady may refer to:

 The Case of the Frightened Lady (play), a play by Edgar Wallace
 The Case of the Frightened Lady (film), a 1940 film adaptation
 The Frightened Lady (1932 film), a 1932 British film directed by T. Hayes Hunter also adapted from the play